Kate Sullivan (born March 1, 1950 in Burwell, Nebraska) is a politician from the state of Nebraska in the Midwestern United States.  In 2008, she was elected to the Nebraska Legislature, representing the 41st District. 

Early life
Kate Sullivan graduated from Ord High School in 1967, and got her B.S. and M.S. at the University of Nebraska-Lincoln in 1971 and 1975 respectively.  She is on the board of directors of Cedar Rapids State Bank and thus is a member of the Nebraska Bankers Association and Nebraska Independent Community Bankers.  She is also the president of Kokes Corporation family farm and the vice president of Bluestem Beef, Inc. Prior to her election to the legislature, she was the treasurer of Cedar Rapids School Board.

State legislature
Sullivan was elected in 2008 to represent the 41st Nebraska legislative district. She was named to the Building Maintenance, Education, Government, Military and Veterans Affairs, and the Legislature's Planning Committees. She served in the legislature for eight years, succeeded by Tom Briese in 2017.

References

 

1950 births
Living people
People from Boone County, Nebraska
People from Garfield County, Nebraska
People from Ord, Nebraska
Democratic Party Nebraska state senators
Women state legislators in Nebraska
School board members in Nebraska
University of Nebraska–Lincoln alumni
21st-century American politicians
21st-century American women politicians